The women's 80 metres hurdles was the only women's hurdle race in the Athletics at the 1964 Summer Olympics program in Tokyo.  It was held on 18 October and 19 October 1964.  31 athletes from 20 nations entered, with 4 not starting the first round.  The first round was held on 18 October, with the semifinals and final on 19 October.  The 1965 film Tokyo Olympiad by Kon Ichikawa shows amazingly great detail of the preliminaries, preparation, final and medal ceremony surrounding this event.  The slow motion study of the final shows Yoda Ikuko getting a fast start.  Joining Ikuko in the lead is Teresa Ciepły.  Rosie Bonds crashed the second hurdle and is awkward the rest of the race.  By the third hurdle Pam Kilborn has overtaken Ikuko and Ciepły for the lead.  Karin Balzer and Irina Press were close behind.  Over the course of the final five hurdles, Balzer and Press edged closer as Ikuko lost a little ground.  Ciepły, Kilborn and Balzer landing at virtually the same moment and Press inches behind.  On the run in, Balzer was able to gain just enough ground to take the gold over a straining Ciepły.

Results

First round

The top four runners in each of the 4 heats advanced.

Heat 1

Heat 2

Heat 3

There was a strong wind behind the runners; the official report does not credit Piątkowska with equalling the Olympic record of 10.6 seconds.

Heat 4

Semifinals

The top four runners in each semifinal advanced to the final.

Semifinal 1

Semifinal 2

Final

Balzer, Ciepły, and Kilborn are not credited by the official report with tying the world record of 10.5 seconds (and breaking the 10.6 second Olympic record) due to the wind advantage.  They finished in one of the closest endings to an Olympic final ever, with Balzer defeating Ciepły by about one-hundredth of a second and Kilborn by two one-hundredths.

References

Athletics at the 1964 Summer Olympics
Sprint hurdles at the Olympics
1964 in women's athletics
Women's events at the 1964 Summer Olympics